A deemed university or deemed-to-be-university is an accreditation granted to higher educational institutions in India by the Department of Higher Education under the Ministry of Education. According to the ministry's definition, the accreditation indicates, "an Institution of higher education, other than universities, working at a very high standard in specific area of study" and the accreditation grants "the academic status and privileges of a university."

Deemed university status
The higher education system in India includes both private and public universities. Public universities are supported by the Government of India and the state governments, while private universities are mostly supported by various bodies and societies. Universities in India are recognized by the University Grants Commission , which draws its power from the University Grants Commission Act, 1956. In addition to this, 15 Professional Councils are established, controlling different aspects of accreditation and coordination. The status of a deemed to be university allows full autonomy in courses, syllabus, admissions and fees. , the UGC lists 126 institutes which were granted the deemed to be university status. According to this list, the first institute to be granted deemed university status was Indian Institute of Science which was granted this status on 12 May 1958. The state with the most deemed universities is Tamil Nadu with 28 universities having deemed status.

Section 12 (B) of the UGC Act of 1956 also grants the UGC the right to "allocate and disburse, out of the Fund of the Commission, grants to Universities..." As such, the UGC categorizes institutes as either "declared fit to receive Central/UGC assistance under Section 12 (B) of the UGC Act–1956", or not, and notes this status at the lists published. Updates to these declarations are done in meetings of the UGC and published in the minutes. The latest list, lists 50 institutes as fit to receive Central/UGC assistance.

Other types
Other types of universities under the regulatory purview of the UGC include:
 Central universities, or Union universities are established by Act of Parliament and are under the purview of the Department of Higher Education.
 State universities are run by the state government of each of the states and territories of India, and are usually established by a state legislative assembly act.
 Institute under State Legislature Act is an Institution established or incorporated by a State Legislature Act, in India. Institutes that are ‘under State Legislature Act’ enjoy academic status and privileges of state universities.
 Private universities are approved by the UGC. They can grant degrees but they are not allowed to have off-campus affiliated colleges.

See also
 List of deemed universities
 List of universities in India

References 

Deemed universities in India
Types of university or college